Transcription factor EC is a protein that in humans is encoded by the TFEC gene.

References

Further reading